Central Bus Station Sofia (abbreviated as CBS) is the main bus station of Sofia, Bulgaria. The bus station has 57 ticket windows, which accept cash, debit and credit. At any time, between 47 and 50 buses may enter or leave the station from 50 domestic and international bus stops. Ten additional bus stops are made available on days with heavy traffic. 2,250 passengers may pass through the waiting area in one hour. There are 130 surveillance cameras.

External links
 Official website
 Nikola Gruev's photo gallery of Central Bus Station Sofia

See also

 Sofia Central Station
 Trams in Sofia
 Trolleybuses in Sofia
 Public buses in Sofia
 Sofia Public Transport

Transport infrastructure completed in 2004
Buildings and structures in Sofia
Transport in Sofia
Bus stations in Europe
Bus transport in Bulgaria